Joseph Unger (2 July 1828 – 12 May 1913) was an Austrian jurist and statesman. Having studied law at the university of his native city, he in 1850 was appointed assistant librarian, and in 1852 privatdozent, at his alma mater. The following year he was called to Prague as assistant professor at the university, and in 1855 to Vienna in a similar capacity. In 1857, he was appointed professor of jurisprudence at the latter institution. In 1867, he was successively elected a member of the Austrian Landtag and of the Reichsrat; but on account of ill health he had to resign in the following year. Appointed in 1869 by the Emperor Franz Joseph a life-member of the House of Lords, he soon became the whip of the Liberal Party. Two years later, he became minister (without portfolio) in Prince Auersperg's cabinet, but resigned upon the prime minister's defeat in 1879. Unger converted from Judaism to Roman Catholicism in 1852.

Literary works 
Of Unger's works the following may be mentioned:
 "Die Ehe in Ihrer Welthistorischen Entwicklung" (Vienna, 1850);
 "Ueber Wissenschaftliche Behandlung des Oesterreichischen Gemeinen Privat-rechtes" (ib. 1853);
 "Der Entwurf eines Bürgerlichen Gesetzbuches für das Königreich Sachsen" (ib. 1853);
 "System des Oesterreichischen Allgemeinen Privatrechts" (Leipzig, 1856–64; vols. i and ii, 5th ed., 1892; vol. vi, 1894) a standard work on Austrian law, which established Unger's reputation;
 "Die Rechtliche Natur der Inhaberpapiere" (Vienna, 1857);
 "Der Revidierte Entwurf eines Bürgerlichen Gesetzbuches für das Königreich Sachsen" (ib. 1861);
 "Zur Lösung der Ungarischen Frage" (ib. 1861; written in collaboration with Adolf Fischhof, and published anonymously), a work advocating a dual monarchy for Austria and Hungary, its appearance marking Unger's entry upon a political career;
 "Die Verlassenschaftsabhandlung in Oesterreich" (ib. 1865); "Zur Reform der Wiener Universität" (ib. 1865);
 "Die Verträge zu Gunsten Dritter" (Jena, 1869);
 "Schuldübernahme" (Vienna, 1889);
 "Handeln auf Eigene Gefahr" (Jena, 1891);
 "Handeln auf Fremde Gefahr" (ib. 1894);

References 

 
 Brockhaus Konversations-Lexikon
 Meyers Konversations-Lexikon

1828 births
1913 deaths
Politicians from Vienna
Austrian Jews
Austrian Roman Catholics
Converts to Roman Catholicism from Judaism
Constitutional Party (Austria) politicians
Government ministers of Austria
Members of the Austrian House of Deputies (1867–1870)
Members of the House of Lords (Austria)
Austrian jurists
University of Vienna alumni